Year 891 (DCCCXCI) was a common year starting on Friday (link will display the full calendar) of the Julian calendar.

Events 
 By place 

 Europe 
 February 21 – Guy III, duke of Spoleto, is crowned Holy Roman Emperor by Pope Stephen V. His son Lambert is proclaimed king of Italy, at the capital of Pavia in Lombardy.
 Summer – Orso, Lombard prince of Benevento, is deposed after the capture of Benevento by the Byzantines. Benevento becomes the capital of the thema of Longobardia.
 Battle of Leuven: Viking raiders on the Dyle River (near Leuven), in modern-day Flanders, suffer a crushing defeat by Frankish forces under King Arnulf of Carinthia.

 Emirate of Córdoba 
 Muslim forces led by Abdullah ibn Muhammad al-Umawi, Umayyad emir of Córdoba, defeat the rebel leader Umar ibn Hafsun at Poley, in Al-Andalus (modern Spain).
 Arabian Empire (Caliphate) 
 June 2 – Al-Muwaffaq, an Abbasid prince and Commander-in-chief, dies at the capital of Baghdad. His son Al-Mu'tadid is recognized as regent, and second heir of the Abbasid Caliphate.

 Japan 
 February 25 – Fujiwara no Mototsune, a Japanese statesman, dies. In his lifetime, he had forced the resignation of Emperor Yōzei and become head of the Fujiwara clan.

 By topic 

 Religion 
 September 14 – Pope Stephen V dies after a 6-year reign. He is succeeded by Formosus, former cardinal bishop of Portus, as the 111th pope of the Catholic Church.

Births 
 Abd al-Rahman III, Umayyad caliph (or 889)
 Ali ibn Buya, founder of the Buyid Dynasty (or 892)
 Gao Conghui, prince and ruler of Jingnan (d. 948)
 Lin Ding, Chinese official and chancellor (d. 944)
 Yuan Dezhao, Chinese chancellor (d. 968)

Deaths 
 February 25 – Fujiwara no Mototsune, Japanese regent (b. 836)
 June 2 – Al-Muwaffaq, Abbasid prince and regent (b. 842)
 June 25 – Sunderolt, archbishop of Mainz
 September 14 – Stephen V, pope of the Catholic Church
 October 23 – Yazaman al-Khadim, Abbasid emir
 Bernard, illegitimate son of Charles the Fat (or 892)
 Chen Yan, Chinese warlord and governor
 Enchin, Japanese Buddhist monk (b. 814)
 Gu Yanlang, Chinese warlord and governor
 Isma'il ibn Bulbul, Abbasid official and vizier
 Mutimir of Serbia, ruler of Principality of Serbia
 Wang Hui, chancellor of the Tang Dynasty

References

Sources